One ship and two shore establishments of the Royal Navy have borne the name HMS Rooke after Admiral Sir George Rooke:

Ship
 HMS Rooke was a Thornycroft-type flotilla leader launched in 1920. She was renamed HMS Broke in 1921, and served until foundering under tow in 1942 after being damaged during Operation Terminal.

Shore establishments
  was the boom defence central depot at Rosyth. It was commissioned in 1940 and paid off in 1946, being renamed HMS Safeguard.
 was the naval base at Gibraltar. It was commissioned in 1946, succeeding , and operating until becoming a Joint Service Base in 1990. This was paid off in 1996.

See also
 , which was a Royal Navy  captured by two French privateers in 1808.

Royal Navy ship names